Markland is the name given by the Icelandic Norseman Leifur Eiríksson to an area of North America.

Markland may also refer to:

Places
Markland, Newfoundland and Labrador, Canada, a settlement
Markland, Indiana, U.S., an unincorporated community

Facilities and structures
Markland (St. Augustine, Florida), U.S., a historic mansion
Markland Locks and Dam, on the Ohio River between Kentucky and Indiana in the U.S.
Markland Mall, Komomo, Indiana, USA; a shopping mall
Markland College, in Oudenbosch and Zevenbergen, Netherlands

Other uses
Markland (surname)
Markland (Scots), a unit of land measurement

See also

Markland Hill, Bolton, Greater Manchester, England, UK
Markland Wood, Toronto, Ontario, Canada

 Mark (disambiguation)
 Land (disambiguation)